Roger Allen is an English scholar of Arabic literature. He was the first student at Oxford University to obtain a PhD degree in modern Arabic literature, which he did under the supervision of Muhammad Mustafa Badawi. His doctoral thesis was on Muhammad al-Muwaylihi’s narrative Hadith Isa ibn Hisham (Isa Ibn Hisham’s Tale), and was later published as a book titled A Period of Time (1974, 1992). At the request of Dr Gaber Asfour, the Director-General of the Supreme Council for Culture in Egypt, he later prepared an edition of the complete works of Muhammad al-Muwaylihi (2002), and that of his father, Ibrahim al-Muwaylihi (2007).

In 1968, Allen moved from Bristol to Philadelphia to take up an academic position at the University of Pennsylvania, where he subsequently taught generations of students and Arabic scholars. He co-wrote an Arabic textbook with Adel Allouche, and was engaged with Arabic pedagogy throughout his career. After a 43-year career at UPenn, he retired in 2011, serving as chair of the Department of Near Eastern Languages & Civilizations for the last six years. 

As a translator, Allen has brought forth into English numerous works of contemporary Arabic literature, a list of which is given below. His translations of Naguib Mahfouz were instrumental in bringing the Egyptian writer to global attention, and Allen also played a critical role in the nomination process that eventually led to Mahfouz winning the Nobel Prize in Literature in 1988. 

 Naguib Mahfouz, God’s World (1973, in conjunction with Akef Abadir) 
 Naguib Mahfouz, Autumn Quail (1985)
 Naguib Mahfouz, Mirrors (1977, 1999) 
 Naguib Mahfouz, Karnak Café (2007) 
 Naguib Mahfouz, Khan al-Khalili (2008) 
 Naguib Mahfouz, One Hour Left (2010) 
 Jabra Ibrahim Jabra, The Ship (in conjunction with Adnan Haydar)
 Jabra Ibrahim Jabra, In Search of Walid Masoud (in conjunction with Adnan Haydar) 
 Yusuf Idris, In the Eye of the Beholder
 Abd al-rahman Munif, Endings
 Mayy Telmissany, Dunyazad
 BenSalim Himmich, The Polymath (2004) 
 BenSalim Himmich, The Theocrat (2005)
 Ahmad al-Tawfiq, Abu Musa’s Women Neighbors (2006)
 Hanan al-Shaykh, The Locust and the Bird (2009) 

One of his key works is The Arabic Novel: an historical and critical introduction (1st edition 1982), which initially took the form of a series of lectures at the University of Manchester. He also wrote a book on the Arabic literary tradition as a whole, titled The Arabic Literary Heritage (1998), which later appeared in shortened paperback format under the title An Introduction to Arabic Literature, which was itself translated into Arabic and published in Cairo in 2003. This is now regarded as the standard work in the field. For the series The Cambridge History of Arabic Literature, he edited the volume spanning 1150 to 1850, which was titled The Post-Classical Period (2006). He has contributed to many other scholarly ventures in his field. His former students prepared a three-part festschrift in his honour in 2008-2009.

References

English translators